Don't Leave Me may refer to:

Songs

 "Don't Leave Me", a 1959 song by Ricky Nelson from Songs by Ricky
 "Don't Leave Me", a 1968 song by Harry Nilsson from Aerial Ballet
 "Don't Leave Me", a 1969 song by Hugo Montenegro from Moog Power
 "Don't Leave Me", a 1971 song by Billy Eckstine from Stormy/Feel the Warm
 "Don't Leave Me", a 1990 song by Green Day from 39/Smooth
 "Don't Leave Me", a 1993 song by Intro from Intro
 "Don't Leave Me" (B'z song), 1994
 "Don't Leave Me" (Blackstreet song), 1997
 "Don't Leave Me", a 1999 song by Blink-182 from Enema of the State
 "Don't Leave Me", a 2002 song by the All-American Rejects from The All-American Rejects
 "Don't Leave Me", a 2006 song by Suzi Rawn from Naked
 "Don't Leave Me", a 2012 song by Nelly Furtado from The Spirit Indestructible (Deluxe)
 "Don't Leave Me (Ne Me Quitte Pas)", a 2012 song by Regina Spektor
 "Don't Leave Me", a 2016 song by Moby and the Void Pacific Choir from These Systems Are Failing
 "Don't Leave Me" (BTS song), 2018
 "Don't Leave Me", a 2021 song by Kodak Black from Haitian Boy Kodak
 "Don't Leave Me", a 2021 song by the Kid Laroi from F*ck Love 3: Over You

Other uses 
 Don't Leave Me (novel), by Stig Sæterbakken, 2009 
 Ne m'abandonne pas, a 2016 French TV movie, also known by its English title Don't Leave Me
Non Mi Lasciare / Don't Leave Me, a 2022 Italian TV series starring Vittoria Puccini

See also
 Don't Leave (disambiguation)
 Don't Leave Me Alone (disambiguation)